The 2019 UCI BMX World Championships were held in Heusden-Zolder, Belgium from 23 to 27 July 2019.

Medal summary

Elite events

Junior events

Medal table

See also
2019 UCI Track Cycling World Championships – Men's keirin

2019 UCI Track Cycling World Championships – Women's keirin

References

External links
Official website

UCI BMX World Championships
BMX Championships
BMX
UCI BMX World Championships
UCI BMX World Championships